There are various modes of transportation available in Rajahmundry and its region in India. Although Auto rickshaws, bicycles are mostly used, mass transit systems – such as buses and trains. It is home for a domestic airport located near Madhurapudi and is named as Rajahmundry Airport.

Roadways 
Main Road, Stadium Road and Katheru Road are the main arterial roads of the city. Tadithota, Nandmam Ganiraju Junction, Devi Chowk and Morampudi Junction are major junctions in the city.
Godavari Bridge is the fourth longest rail-cum-road bridge in Asia. Godavari Fourth Bridge was later constructed to ease the traffic on Godavari Bridge.

Public transport 

Bus Transit is the major mode of passenger transport in the city. APS RTC Bus Complex is the major bus station in the city, alongside Kotipalli and Gokavaram bus stands. City bus services fleet run across three of the busiest routes in the city.

Train Transit is the major mode of transportation in the city, Rajahmundry is an ‘A’–category station in Vijayawada division and one of the top 100 booking stations in India. Godavari station is a satellite station with category–‘D’ located adjacent to River Godavari to ease travel for tourists visiting the city.

Airways 

Airplanes are often used by passengers as they connect Rajahmundry to major cities and other tourist destinations. It is a domestic airport with direct flight connectivity to Hyderabad, Bengaluru, Chennai. A new runway is set to complete within a few months, which makes it the holder of longest runway in Andhra Pradesh.

References 

 
Transport in Andhra Pradesh by city